Nirmala Rajasekar is a Carnatic Saraswati veena player, composer, vocalist, and educator. One of the world's premier veena players, Rajasekar has performed at Carnegie Hall, the United Nations, the Madras Music Academy, Narada Gana Sabha, Sawai Gandharva Festival, and the Konya International Mystic Music Festival. Rajasekar is the current co-chair of the American Composers Forum.

Early life 
Nirmala Rajasekar began her training in the Saraswati veena at the age of 6 in Chennai with Sri Deva Kottai Narayana Iyengar and Smt. Kamala Aswathama, the mother of Smt. E. Gayathri. After moving to Bangalore, she studied at the Gana Mandira School in Basavangudi with Smt. G Chennama and Smt. E. P. Alamelu. Rajasekar also received guidance from violinist Sri A.D. Zachariah and Veena Sri S. Balachander.

Rajasekar began her career as a soloist at the age of 13. Upon returning to Chennai, Rajasekar came under the tutelage of Saraswati veena player Smt. Kalpakam Swaminathan, with whom she trained for nearly thirty years. Through Swaminathan, Rajasekar is part of the Dikshitar shisya parampara. In Chennai and Delhi, Rajasekar studied Carnatic vocal music with Sri B. Sitarama Sarma and Prof T.R. Subramaniam, receiving a Government of India scholarship to study with the latter.

Musical career 
Rajasekar has been performing and composing for over forty years. In her career, Rajasekar performs traditional Carnatic repertoire as a Saraswati veena exponent and creates contemporary works through compositions and collaborations. In 2020, Rajasekar was the annual Commissioned Composer of the University of Wisconsin-River Falls, the longest-running program of its kind in the United States. Past composers include Pauline Oliveros, Morton Feldman, John Cage, Jennifer Higdon, and Julia Wolfe.

In 2007, Rajasekar's album Song of the Veena was released by Innova Recordings, and in 2010, Innova released her album Into the Raga. Rajasekar's third album with Innova, a collaborative world music album called Maithree: The Music of Friendship, was released in 2018. The album was reviewed by Songlines, WNYC New Sounds, and Jazz Weekly. Other albums include Sudha Saagara, released by Charsur Digital Workstation, and Melodic Expressions.

Rajasekar has collaborated with artists including Pt. Ronu Majumdar, Pt. Tarun Bhattacharya, Pt. Gaurav Majumdar, Sri Mysore Manjunath, Sounds of Blackness, Gao Hong, Anthony Cox, and poet Robert Bly.

Rajasekar is an A-Grade artist of All-India Radio, and has appeared on Australian Broadcasting Corporation, British Broadcasting Company, and Doordarshan Television. Since 1989, Rajasekar has been a performing artist for the Indian Council for Cultural Relations. Rajasekar has been featured at the National Music Museum and the "Beyond Bollywood" exhibit presented by the Minnesota Historical Society and the Smithsonian Institution.

Since 1995, Rajasekar has lived in Minnesota, USA, touring several months each year to countries such as India, Turkey, Australia, New Zealand, and Singapore. Rajasekar's daughter and student, Shruthi Rajasekar, is a composer and vocalist.

Positions 
Rajasekar is the founder and artistic director of the Naadha Rasa Center for Music, and was recognized with the Prof. T.R. Subrahmanyam Teaching Award by the Cleveland Thyagaraja Festival. She is also a COMPAS teaching artist. Rajasekar currently serves as the co-chair of the Board of the American Composers Forum and the Vice President of the Global Carnatic Musicians Association.

Awards 

 Kalaimamani Award from the Government of Tamil Nadu
 2020 Annual Commissioned Composer of University of Wisconsin-River Falls
 2018 Pratibha Puraskar ("Genius Prize") from Delhi Telugu Academy 
 Vocational Excellence Award from Rotary Club International
 2010 McKnight Fellowship 
 2006 Bush Fellowship

References

Saraswati veena players
Living people
Musicians from Chennai
Year of birth missing (living people)
Indian women classical musicians
Women Carnatic musicians
Carnatic musicians
Indian music educators
Women musicians from Tamil Nadu
20th-century Indian women musicians
20th-century Indian composers
Women music educators
20th-century women composers